Mystic Journey may refer to:
 Mystic Journey (album), by Arlo Guthrie
 Mystic Journey (horse), a racehorse
 "Mystic Journey", a song by Jhené Aiko from her album Trip